Randolph Ramnarace (born 25 July 1941) is a former first-class cricketer who played mostly for Guyana.

Ramnarace, a middle-order batsman and medium-paced bowler, was a regular member of the British Guiana/Guyana team from 1965–66 to 1972–73. He never quite made enough runs or took enough wickets to warrant selection for the West Indies Test team, although he played for the Rest of the World team that made a short tour of England in 1968, when he also played regularly for the International Cavaliers as well as taking 59 wickets at an average of 14.42 to lead the Surrey Second XI attack to the Second XI Championship.

He played Lancashire League cricket as the professional for Colne in 1969. He was the leading bowler in the Worsley Cup, which Colne won, taking 19 wickets at an average of 8.57.

His highest first-class score was 71, Guyana's highest score in the match, against Jamaica during the 1968–69 Shell Shield season. His best first-class bowling figures were 6 for 101 for Berbice against Demerara in the Jones Cup in 1971–72.

References

External links
 Randolph Ramnarace at CricketArchive
 Randolph Ramnarace at Cricinfo
 Randolph Ramnarace at Guyana Cricket website

1941 births
Living people
People from East Berbice-Corentyne
Guyanese cricketers
Guyana cricketers
Berbice cricketers